Georges Morel (11 July 1938 – 21 November 2004) was a French rower who competed in the 1964 Summer Olympics.

Morel was born in La Teste-de-Buch in 1938 and died there in 2004, aged 66. In 1964 he was a crew member of the French boat that won the silver medal in the coxed pair event partnered with his elder brother Jacques Morel.

References

External links
 

1938 births
2004 deaths
French male rowers
Olympic rowers of France
Rowers at the 1964 Summer Olympics
Olympic silver medalists for France
Olympic medalists in rowing
Knights of the Ordre national du Mérite
World Rowing Championships medalists for France
Medalists at the 1964 Summer Olympics
Sportspeople from Gironde